James Freeman Wells is a British politician. He was elected as a Brexit Party Member of the European Parliament (MEP) for the Wales constituency in the 2019 election serving until January 2020. He was second on his party's list after Nathan Gill (former UKIP MEP).

Early life and education
Wells left formal education at the age of 16. He returned to full-time education twelve years later and studied psychology at the University of Liverpool and later a Masters in the same subject at Cranfield University.

Career
Prior to joining politics, he was head of the UK trade team at the Office for National Statistics. Wells quit the role and his membership to the Conservative Party in order to run as a candidate for the Brexit Party in the Wales constituency in the 2019 European Parliament election. He had only joined the Conservatives in 2018 with the purpose of being able to vote if a leadership election was called. In the election, Wells became an MEP alongside fellow Brexit Party candidate Nathan Gill. 

In the European Parliament, Wells was a member of the Committee on International Trade and part of the delegation for relations with the countries of the Andean community.

Wells stood for the Brexit Party in Islwyn in the 2019 general election; he received 14% of the vote. He also stood for the successor party Reform UK in Islwyn and South Wales East in the 2021 Senedd election.

Personal life
Wells is married and has two children and lives in Wales. He reports that he is dyslexic.

References

Living people
Year of birth missing (living people)
Brexit Party MEPs
Reform UK parliamentary candidates
MEPs for Wales 2019–2020
Politicians with dyslexia